In Reality (March 1, 1964 – May 8, 1989) was an American bred racehorse. Bred in Florida, he was a son of Intentionally and out of the mare My Dear Girl, the 1959 American Champion Two-Year-Old Filly. His damsire was Santa Anita Derby winner Rough'n Tumble, who sired U.S. Racing Hall of Fame inductee Dr. Fager.  In Reality is best remembered for his win in the Florida Derby and his runner-up performance in the Preakness Stakes to Eclipse Award Champion and millionaire Damascus.

Race career

In Reality started his stakes career with a second-place finish in the Cowdin Stakes to the young Dr. Fager and then ran second in the Sapling Stakes. He finished his two-year-old season with a run in the Pimlico Futurity, beating out that year's champion two-year-old, Successor, for the win.

In his three-year-old season, In Reality started the year with a win in the Hibiscus Stakes. In Reality then finished second in the Florida Breeders' Stakes and the Flamingo Stakes before he won the Fountain of Youth and the Florida Derby. He then moved on to the Preakness, where he finished second to Damascus. This effort was followed by wins in the Jersey Derby, Rumson Handicap and Choice Stakes.

In Reality next met up again with Damascus in the American Derby and came in second once more. Against Dr. Fager in the New Hampshire Sweepstakes Classic, he finished second again. In Reality made one more attempt at another stakes in the Jerome Handicap and again was second; after that, he laid off for the rest of the season.

In his four-year-old season, he finished third in both the Royal Palm and the Seminole Handicap. After taking a month off, he won the John B. Campbell Handicap, Carter Handicap, and Metropolitan Handicap. In Reality retired soon after his win in the Metropolitan to stand at stud for Frances A. Genter in Florida.

Stud career

In Reality was bred and raced by Frances A. Genter and became an outstanding sire of three Champions and a good sire of sires. In Reality's male line remains one of the only male lines directly descended from Man O' War.

In Reality is the sire of:
 Desert Vixen (b. 1970) - U.S. Racing Hall of Fame Filly
 Smile (b. 1982) - Won 1986 Breeders' Cup Sprint, American Champion Sprint Horse, Damsire of Smarty Jones
 Known Fact (b. 1977) - Won the 1979 Middle Park Stakes & the 1980 2,000 Guineas Stakes, English Champion Three-Year-Old Colt
 Relaunch (b. 1976) - Won Del Mar Derby. Grandsire of Hall of Fame inductee Tiznow. Damsire of 2004 World's Top Ranked Horse  Ghostzapper and Real Shadai, the 1993 Leading sire in Japan
 Believe It (b. 1975) Won Wood Memorial Stakes, third in Kentucky Derby and Preakness Stakes.  Damsire of 1998 Kentucky Derby and Preakness Stakes and Eclipse Award winner Real Quiet.

In Reality is also the damsire of:
 Commendable (b. 1997) - Won 2000 Belmont Stakes
 Mane Minister (b. 1988) - Won 1991 Santa Catalina Stakes
 Toussaud (b. 1989) - Won 1993 Gamely Stakes and Kentucky Broodmare of the Year
 Meadow Star (b. 1988) - Won 1990 Breeders' Cup Juvenile Fillies and American Champion Two-Year-Old Filly

Pedigree 

In Reality is inbred 3x3 to War Relic, meaning War Relic appears twice in the third generation of his pedigree.

References

External links
 In Reality's pedigree and partial racing stats

1964 racehorse births
1989 racehorse deaths
Racehorses bred in Florida
Racehorses trained in the United States
Thoroughbred family 21-a
Godolphin Arabian sire line
Chefs-de-Race